Nobleboro or Nobleborough may refer to the following:
 Nobleboro, Maine
 Nobleboro, New York
 Nobleborough (meteorite), a meteorite fall that occurred in Nobleboro, Maine in 1823